The Lake Chad gerbil or Lake Chad tateril (Taterillus lacustris) is a species of rodent found in Cameroon and Nigeria. Its natural habitats are dry savanna, subtropical or tropical dry shrubland, and arable land.

References

Taterillus
Mammals described in 1907
Taxa named by Oldfield Thomas
Rodents of Africa
Taxonomy articles created by Polbot